Tiffany Willoughby-Herard is an American academic and author who is an associate professor in the Department of African American Studies at the University of California, Irvine and President of the National Conference of Black Political Scientists. Her research focusses on black political thought, black radical movements, and queer and trans sexualities.

Willoughby-Herard authored the book Waste of a White Skin: The Carnegie Corporation and the Racial Logic of White Vulnerability (University of California Press 2015)  and edited the volume Theories of Blackness: On Life and Death (Cognella 2011). Waste of a White Skin was reviewed widely in the academic press, including reviews by Clarence Lusane in the Journal of Race, Ethnicity, and Politics, Grace Davie in the African Studies Review, and Annika Teppo in the Journal of Southern African Studies.  

Willoughby-Herard has published articles in Journal of Contemporary Thought; Cultural Dynamics; African Identities; Social Justice; National Political Science Review; Politics, Groups, & Identities; South African Review of Sociology, New Political Science, Race in Anthropology, focusing on intersectional topics in universities in the US and South Africa, among others "Mammy No More/Mammy Forever", "Poetic Labors and Challenging Political Science: An Epistolary Poem", and further topics such as biomedical radicalization. 

Willoughby-Herard is guest editor of special issues including: “Black Feminism and Afro-Pessimism” (2018) co-edited with M. Shadee Malaklou in Theory and Event; “Challenging the Legacies of Racial Resentment: Black Health Activism, Educational Justice, and Legislative Leadership” (2017) co-edited with Julia Jordan-Zachery in the National Political Science Review; “Twenty Years of South African Democracy, Volume 1” (2015) co-edited with Abebe Zegeye in African Identities; “Cedric J. Robinson: Radical Historiography, Black Ontology, and Freedom” (2013) co-edited with H.L.T. Quan in African Identities. (Routledge 2017). 

Willoughby-Herard is the former editor of the National Political Science Review (2016–2019), current book review editor for Safundi: The Journal of South African and American Studies, member of the editorial advisory board for the journal of the Critical Ethnic Studies Association.

In 2016, Willoughby-Herard was a member of the Women of Color Advisory Board to the Committee on the Status of Women in the Profession for the American Political Science Association.

Awards and memberships 

 2018: University of California Humanities Research Institute, Short-term Residential Research Groups, Words of Wild Survival: Wombs, Wounds, Wastelands, and Water
2017: Mae C. King Distinguished Paper Award on Women, Gender and Black Politics, Association for the Study of Black Women in Politics
 2017 Pipeline Award for serving as an outstanding mentor and introducing the most students to the NCOBPS 2017 Annual Meeting
 2015 and 2011: UC Irvine Chancellor's Award for Fostering Undergraduate Research
 2009: Lucius Barker Best Paper Award in Racial and Ethnic Politics
 Member of the LGBTQ+ Caucus of the National Conference of Black Political Scientists
 Former president of the LGBTQ Caucus of the American Political Science Association
 Former co-chair of the Ken Sherrill Best Dissertation on Sexuality and Politics Prize Award Committee
 Past member of the African Politics Conference Group Best Paper Award Committee.

References 

African-American academics
African-American feminists
American women essayists
1973 births
Living people

African-American non-fiction writers
African-American women writers
Black studies scholars
Critical theorists
21st-century American non-fiction writers
African-American activists
21st-century American women writers
Academics from Michigan
Writers from Detroit

Feminist theorists
Radical feminists
Feminist studies scholars
American feminist writers